A list of alumni of note from Trent University.

Politics
 John Horgan, Premier of British Columbia 2017-present
 Sheila Malcolmson, Minister of Mental Health and Addictions for British Columbia, and MLA for (Nanaimo) 2019-present
 Nathan Cullen, Member of the Legislative of British Columbia (Stikine) 2020-present, former Member of Parliament (Skeena-Bulkley Valley)
 Maryam Monsef, former Member of Parliament, Peterborough-Kawartha (2015-2021) and Minister of Status of Women in the 42nd Parliament of Canada, 
 Michelle Ferreri, Member of Parliament, Peterborough-Kawartha (2021-present)
 Jeff Leal, former Member of Provincial Parliament (2003-2018) and Minister of Agriculture, Food, and Rural Affairs in the 41st Parliament of Ontario
 Chris Hodgson, former Ontario government cabinet minister
 Lucie Edwards, diplomat, Canadian High Commissioner to India, Kenya and South Africa; Ambassador in Nepal
 Jennifer May Alice Loten,  Ambassador and Permanent Representative of Canada to the Organization of American States in Washington, D.C.
 Laurie Peters, High Commissioner of Canada to Jamaica
 Stewart Wheeler, Ambassador to Iceland.
 Takako Suzuki, Japanese politician.

Arts
 Yann Martel, writer (Life of Pi)
 Linwood Barclay, journalist and novelist
 Paul Boghossian, philosopher
 Gary Botting, poet, playwright, lawyer and legal scholar
 Tim Cook, historian and author
 Mani Haghighi, filmmaker
 Richard Harrison, poet
 Christine Love, visual novelist
 Leah McLaren, writer
 James Motluk, filmmaker
 Paul Nicholas Mason, writer

Business
 Darren Huston, Fmr. CEO of Priceline
 Don Tapscott, writer/futurist

Media
 Stephen Stohn, entertainment lawyer and television producer (Degrassi franchise)
 Jason "Human Kebab" Parsons, member of the band Ubiquitous Synergy Seeker (USS)
 David McGuffin, CBC News, Africa correspondent
 Nancy Anne Sakovich, model, actress
 Ian Tamblyn, Juno Award-winning folk music singer-songwriter, record producer and playwright

Religious
 Michael Mulhall, Bishop of Pembroke
 Peter Elliott, Dean of New Westminster, Vancouver

Law
 Kofi Barnes - Judge of the Ontario Superior Court of Justice

Medicine
 James Orbinski, Doctors without Borders, Nobel Prize winner

Academia
 Christl Verduyn, Professor of English literature and Canadian Studies; recipient of the Governor General's International Award for Canadian Studies (2006)
 Ian K. Affleck, Professor of Physics and Astronomy at the University of British Columbia.
 Duane Rousselle, Professor of Sociology and Noted Psychoanalyst; recipient of the Governor General's Academic Medal

Sports
 Leonid Urlichich, rally driver

References